Luis Nunoz was a Spanish bobsledder who competed in the late 1950s. He won a bronze medal in the two-man event at the 1957 FIBT World Championships in St. Moritz.

References
Bobsleigh two-man world championship medalists since 1931

Possibly living people
Spanish male bobsledders
Year of birth missing